Loria's satinbird or velvet satinbird  (Cnemophilus loriae), formerly known as Loria's bird-of-paradise, is a species of bird in the family Cnemophilidae.
It is found in the New Guinea Highlands.
Its natural habitats are subtropical or tropical moist lowland forests and subtropical or tropical moist montane forests.

The common name and Latin binomial commemorate the Italian ethnographer Lamberto Loria.

References

Loria's satinbird
Loria's satinbird
Taxonomy articles created by Polbot